ELTA is a Lithuanian news agency based in the Lithuanian capital Vilnius. In a day, it receives about 5,000 news articles and produces about 300 articles in Lithuanian, Russian, and English. ELTA cooperates with foreign news agencies such as Reuters, ITAR-TASS, DPA, PAP, Xinhua, and others.

History
ELTA was founded in March 1920 in Kaunas, the temporary capital of Lithuania, by Juozas Eretas, the first director of the agency, a literature professor, publicist, and public figure of Swiss descent who sought to make the ELTA news wire as efficient and reliable as a "Swiss watch". ELTA was founded based on Lithuanian press bureaus that were established in Switzerland, Denmark, France, Sweden, Germany during World War I. The agency was owned by the Ministry of Foreign Affairs.

Between 1920 and 1940, ELTA cooperated closely with the most prominent foreign agencies – its five teleprinters used to send news from Reuters (UK), DNB (Germany), Havas (France), Stefani (Italy) and TASS (Soviet Union). ELTA employed correspondents in Moscow and Berlin. When Soviet troops occupied Lithuania in 1940, ELTA was incorporated into TASS and relayed news from Moscow. Lithuanians who escaped the Soviet occupation established a free ELTA in Germany. The Supreme Committee for the Liberation of Lithuania (VLIK) published various ELTA bulletins in Lithuanian, German, Italian, English, Spanish, Portuguese.

When Lithuania declared independence in 1990, ELTA also re-established its independence from TASS and its direct contacts with the leading global agencies. In 1996, ELTA was partially sold by the government of Lithuania (the law required the government to retain at least 35% of the shares). In 2003, MG Baltic owned 50.86% and Achema Group owned 6.75% of the shares. In 2006, publisher of the daily Lietuvos aidas, acquired 39.51% of shares that were owned by the government. In August 2017, Gitana Markovičienė announced plans to purchase the controlling stake in ELTA and became the new CEO. The deal for the purchase of 80% of the shares closed in February 2018. GM Media Invest, owned by Markovičienė, acquired the remaining 20% of shares in January 2020 to become the sole owner of ELTA.

Directors
ELTA directors were:

See also
 Eastern Bloc information dissemination

References

External links 
 

Eastern Bloc mass media
News agencies based in Lithuania
1920 establishments in Lithuania
Mass media in Vilnius
Mass media companies established in 1920